The Čertovy hlavy (English: The Devil Heads) are a pair of 9 metre high rock sculptures in the municipality of Želízy in the Central Bohemian Region of Czech Republic.

History and description
Čertovy hlavy were created by Václav Levý in 1841–1846. In terms of dimensions, it is a unique work in the Czech Republic. They are the second largest carved heads in the world, after the carvings of Mount Rushmore in the United States.

The sculptures have been damaged by time and weather. In 2011, the private owner had the surrounding pine forest cut down, allowing the heads to be seen from the I/9 road. Further sandstone reliefs can be found near the Čertovy hlavy, known as Harfenice ('Harpist') and Had ('Snake') reliefs.

Gallery

See also
Klácelka, a man-made cave near Čertovy hlavy
List of colossal sculptures in situ

References

Rock formations of the Czech Republic
Landmarks in the Czech Republic
Mělník District